Susanna Boylston Adams may refer to:

Susanna Boylston (1708–1797), mother of U.S. President John Adams
Susanna Adams (1768–1770), daughter of U.S. President John Adams